Mimardaris is a Neotropical genus of firetip butterflies in the family Hesperiidae. The genus was erected by Olaf Hermann Hendrik Mielke in 2002.

Species
Mimardaris aerata (Godman & Salvin, 1879) Colombia
Mimardaris lomax (Evans, 1951) Peru
Mimardaris minthe (Godman & Salvin, 1879) Ecuador
Mimardaris montra (Evans, 1951) Peru
Mimardaris pityusa (Hewitson, 1857 Colombia, Ecuador
Mimardaris porus (Plötz, 1879) Colombia, Peru
Mimardaris sela (Hewitson, 1866) Colombia, Ecuador, Bolivia, Peru

References

External links
 With images.
Original description: 

Hesperiidae genera
Hesperiidae of South America